The 1931 Arizona State–Flagstaff Lumberjacks football team was an American football team that represented Arizona State Teachers College at Flagstaff (now known as Northern Arizona University) in the Border Conference during the 1931 college football season. In their fourth year under head coach Rudy Lavik, the Lumberjacks compiled a 3–5 record.

Schedule

References

Arizona State-Flagstaff
Northern Arizona Lumberjacks football seasons
Arizona State-Flagstaff Lumberjacks football